The Collings Foundation is a private non-profit educational foundation located in Stow, Massachusetts, with a mission dedicated to the preservation and public display of transportation-related history, namely automobile and aviation history. The Collings Foundation is headquartered at a small private airfield in Stow that includes a small museum that opens for special events and pre-scheduled tour groups.

The American Heritage Museum, a collection of military vehicles, is located on the grounds of the foundation. The organization also has a satellite operations base at Ellington Field in Houston, Texas, primarily housing its Korean War and Vietnam War jet aircraft and helicopter collection.

The Collings Foundation operates two touring collections of historic military aircraft: The Wings of Freedom Tour and The Vietnam Memorial Flight. The Wings of Freedom flights also provided a platform for testing a smartphone-based automatic dependent surveillance – broadcast (ADS-B), a means of future air safety technology.

The Collings Foundation offered vintage warbird rides to the general public in exchange for donations until permission for such flights was revoked by the Federal Aviation Administration following the fatal 2019 crash of the foundation's B-17G.

History
The organization was founded in 1979 by Robert F. Collings and Caroline Collings. , Caroline Collings continues to serve as financial director, while son Rob Collings is the CEO and chief pilot of the foundation.

On July 4, 2013, the Military Vehicle Technology Foundation founded by Jacques Littlefield and located in Portola Valley, California, donated their entire collection of military vehicles to the Collings Foundation. A year later, the Collings Foundation auctioned off 120 of the vehicles to fund creation of a new museum at their headquarters. The remaining vehicles are now the centerpiece of the American Heritage Museum in Stow, Massachusetts.

The organization's B-17G Flying Fortress crashed in October, 2019, killing seven of the thirteen people on board. In March 2020, the organization's permission to carry passengers was revoked by the Federal Aviation Administration (FAA), citing “notable maintenance discrepancies” and a failure to maintain a “a culture of safety” leading up to the crash.

Collection

Aircraft collection

Airworthy aircraft

 Bell UH-1E Iroquois
 Bleriot XI
 Boeing PT-17 Kaydet
 Boeing PT-17 Kaydet
 Cessna UC-78 Bobcat
 Consolidated B-24J Liberator "Witchcraft"
 Curtiss Headless Pusher
 Curtiss Model F
 Curtiss P-40B Tomahawk
 Curtiss TP-40N Warhawk
 Douglas A-1E Skyraider
 Douglas TA-4J Skyhawk
 Eastern FM-2 Wildcat
 Eastern TBM-3E Avenger
 Grumman F6F-3 Hellcat
 Lockheed P-38L Lightning "Pudgy V"
 Lockheed T-33
 McDonnell F-4D Phantom II
 Messerschmitt Me 262 Schwalbe "White 1" – Reproduction
 Morane-Saulnier MS.500 Criquet
 North American A-36 Mustang
 North American AT-6 Texan
 North American B-25J Mitchell "Tondelayo"
 North American F-100F Super Sabre
 North American TF-51D Mustang "Toulouse Nuts"
 North American TP-51C Mustang "Betty Jane"
 Supermarine Spitfire IX
 Vought F4U-5NL Corsair
 Waco UPF-7

Static aircraft

 Lockheed T-33
 Messerschmitt Bf 109 G-10
 Wright Model EX "Vin Fiz Flyer" – Replica

Aircraft under restoration

 Boeing B-17 Flying Fortress 44-83785
 Consolidated PBY-5A Catalina
 Douglas A-26B Invader
 Fairchild PT-19
 Focke-Wulf Fw 190 F-8 "White One", Werknummer 931 862
 Focke-Wulf Fw 190 D-9 "White Two"
 Grumman G-21 Goose
 Nieuport 28
 Piper L-4H Grasshopper 43-30426 "Rosie the Rocketer" (flown by then-Major Charles Carpenter in France, 1944).

Automobile collection

Brass era

1901 Oldsmobile Curved Dash
1904 Franklin Type A Roadster
1906 Pope Waverly Electric Carriage, original un-restored
1906 Stanley Steamer Touring Car (20 hp)
1908 Cadillac Open Roadster Runabout
1913 Ford Model T Touring Car
1913 Mercer Speedster Raceabout (replica)
1914 Stutz Bearcat
1915 Buick Touring Car
1916 Chalmers Model 120 Sedan
1916 Chevrolet Baby Grand Touring
1916 Oldsmobile Model 44 Touring Car
1919 Willys-Sterns Knight Touring Car

Roaring 20s

1921 Marmon Model 34 Speedster
1924 Ford Model T
1926 Chevrolet Woody Depot Hack

Classic era

1927 Rolls-Royce Springfield Phantom 1 Phaeton
1928 Packard Model 533 Sedan
1928 Chrysler Model 72 Roadster
1928 Packard Phaeton
1928 Pierce Arrow Series 81 Limousine
1929 LaSalle Model 2H
1929 Pontiac Model F Cabriolet
1930 Cord Model L29 Convertible Coupe
1931 Studebaker President
1932 Duesenberg SJ Dual-Cowl Phaeton
1935 Packard Model 1208, Convertible Sedan
1936 Auburn Boat-Tail Speedster
1937 Cord Model 812 Phaeton

Celebrity cars
1940 Cadillac Limousine V-16, owned by Al Capone, original un-restored

Indianapolis 500 cars

1961 Trevis/Offy – Trevis team car, sister car to the 1961 winner. Ran Indy 1961–1964.
1972 Gurney Eagle/Turbo Offy – Leader card Spl. Team car. Ran Indy 1972–1974.
1979 Porsche Indy – The factory race car that smashed all track records before being banned.
1980 Penske PC-9/Cosworth DFX – Mario Andretti's Michigan 500 winner. Ran Indy.
1980, Qualified second with Mario Andretti. Also driven to victory by Rick Mears at the Copa Mexico 125. 
1987 March/Buick – Rich Vogler's best Indy effort 
1995 Lola/Ford XB – Michael Andretti's race winning car

Other race cars

1996 Rilley & Scott MkIII/Ford winner of the 1997 Rolex 24 hours of Daytona
1990 Nissan 300ZX- Factory team car winner of the 24 hours of Daytona, 12 hours of Sebring and the Drivers and constructors championship
1993 Porsche RS America- Rolex 24 and Sebring 12 hour veteran, the first team car of Champion Porsche

Sprint cars: 1920s–WWII

1932 Crager-Ford
1932 Gemsa Ford
1936 Thomas Spl.
1937 Offy 270 ci.
1937 Rutherford – winner of over 300 races!
1937 Ranger-Aircraft Engine
Drayer-Ford
Riley Four Port

Sprint cars: post WWII-1950s
1950 Ford/Offy

Midget racers: 1930s-1950s

1936 Sowers- a rare Offy derivative
Caruso-Offy 110 ci. supercharged by Maserati
Studebaker
Elto Outboard
Indian
(3) Ford V-8/60

Military vehicles
Source:

 1917 Vim "Camp Devens Express"
 1920 Ford Model T Ambulance
 1942 Ford Jeep, GPW Willys MB
 1943 White Motor Co. M-16 half-track
M1917 6 Ton tank (American version of the Renault FT)
Panzer I. A
Panzer V "Panther" Ausf. A. Only running Panther in the USA
Mercedes G4 staff car
Vickers Mk. IV light tank
Sherman turret trainer
M3 Lee
Matilda MK.II tank
Sd.Kfz. 10 1-Ton – German half-track | Personnel  Carrier/Prime Mover
Leichter Panzerspähwagen Sd.Kfz. 222 armored scout car – Germany
BMW R75 motorcycle and side car
M3A1 scout car 
M5A1 Stuart light tank
VW Kübelwagen Type 82
Schwimmwagen Type 166
T-34/76 Tank
Sd.Kfz. 251/1 Ausf. D armored half-track
Sd.Kfz. 2 Kleines Kettenkrad "track-cycle"
LCVP "Higgins Boat" 
Cromwell I tank
Jagdpanzer 38t Hetzer
M4A3E2 Sherman "Jumbo" tank
M16 MGMC half track
M8 Scott
M22 Locust airborne tank
M18 Hellcat tank destroyer 
A34 Comet 
IS-2 Iosef Stalin 
SU-100
Sd.Kfz. 8 12 ton German half-track
Kommandogerät 38 
V-1 "JB-2 Loon"
M8 Greyhound
LVT(A)-4 Landing Vehicle 
M29C Weasel
Daimler Dingo Mk1 
M3 Gun Motor Carriage
M7 Priest SPH
M26A1 Pershing
M24 Chaffee
M39 Armored Utility Vehicle
M2A1 Bradley Fighting Vehicle
ZPU-23 Anti Aircraft Gun
M41 Walker Bulldog
M48 Patton
PT-76 Amphibious Tank
T72G
M551 Sheridan
M60A1
T-55 
MAZ-7310/Scud-B Missile Launcher 
ZSU-23-4 SHILKA Anti-Aircraft Tank 
2S1 GVOZDIKA
M1A1 Abrams Tank 
QinetiQ TALON robot
iRobot PackBot

Trucks and farm vehicles

1909 Peerless Steam Tractor
1915 Walker Electric Truck
1920s International Harvester
1931 Diamond T Truck
1931 Chevrolet Model C Cab-Truck

References

External links
 
 The Last Flying B-24 Bomber (Collings Foundation) via YouTube

Aerospace museums in Massachusetts
Automobile museums in Massachusetts
Educational foundations in the United States
Non-profit organizations based in Massachusetts
Ellington Airport (Texas)
Museums established in 1979
1979 establishments in Massachusetts